Kolarov is a Bulgarian and Serbian surname, an occupational surname derived from kolar, meaning "wheelwright". Notable people with the surname include:

Aleksandar Kolarov (born 1985), Serbian footballer
Atanas Kolarov (born 1934), Bulgarian chess player
Nelko Kolarov (born 1959), Bulgarian composer
Nikola Kolarov (born 1983), Serbian footballer
Vasil Kolarov (1877–1950), Bulgarian politician
Vlad Kolarov, Canadian cartoonist

Serbian surnames
Bulgarian-language surnames
Occupational surnames